Atna Peaks is an eroded stratovolcano or shield volcano in the Wrangell Mountains of eastern Alaska. Because the mountain is almost entirely covered in glaciers, no geological studies have been done, but published references state and the geological map shows that the mountain is an old eroded volcanic edifice.

Atna Peaks was named in 1965 by the first ascent party from the Mountaineering Club of Alaska, because the "peaks are at the edge of the Copper River drainage and the old Indian name for that river was Atna."


See also

List of mountain peaks of North America
List of mountain peaks of the United States
List of mountain peaks of Alaska
List of volcanoes in the United States

References

External links

Landforms of Copper River Census Area, Alaska
Mountains of Alaska
Mountains of Unorganized Borough, Alaska
North American 4000 m summits
Shield volcanoes of the United States
Stratovolcanoes of the United States
Subduction volcanoes
Volcanoes of Alaska
Volcanoes of Unorganized Borough, Alaska
Wrangell–St. Elias National Park and Preserve